Ufeyn is a district in the northeastern Bari region of Somalia.

Location
The settlement is situated near the border with the Sanaag region in Somaliland and just off the road, between Bosaso and Iskushuban in the desert foothills on the south side of the Ahl Mescat Mountains.

Education
Ufeyn has a number of academic institutions. According to the Puntland Ministry of Education, there are 10 primary schools in the Ufeyn District. Among these are Darul Cilmi, Kobdhexad, Geesa Qabad and Jedaal
. Secondary schools in the area include the Abdullahi Ibrahim Secondary.

Notes

References
Ufeyn, Somalia

Populated places in Bari, Somalia